Licenza may refer to:

Licenza, a municipality in the Province of Rome

Licenza (musical term), a feature of some operas written in the 18th century or earlier